The 1940 Utah State Aggies football team was an American football team that represented Utah State Agricultural College in the Mountain States Conference (MSC) during the 1940 college football season. In their 22nd season under head coach Dick Romney, the Aggies compiled a 2–5–1 record (2–4 against MSC opponents), finished sixth in the MSC, and were outscored by a total of 104 to 48.

Schedule

References

Utah State
Utah State Aggies football seasons
Utah State Aggies football